Four in One is an album of Thelonious Monk's compositions performed by saxophonist Sonny Fortune which was recorded in 1994 and released on the Blue Note label.

Reception

The AllMusic review by Scott Yanow stated: "After years of erratic albums altoist Sonny Fortune finally made a great recording with this release ... Fortune plays quite passionately and really digs into the material, creating one of the finest recordings of his career". On All About Jazz, Florence Wetzell noted: "Clearly Monk has a resonance with Fortune—the interpretations are spot on, yet they are infused with his unique spirit".

Track listing
All compositions by Thelonious Monk
 "Four in One" – 6:02
 "Criss Cross" – 5:03
 "Reflections" – 6:44
 "Monk's Dream" – 8:19
 "Hornin' In" – 7:00
 "Coming on the Hudson" – 4:38
 "Trinkle, Tinkle" – 5:36
 "Pannonica" – 4:12
 "Hackensack" – 7:17
 "Ask Me Now" – 7:27

Personnel
Sonny Fortune – alto saxophone, flute
Kirk Lightsey – piano (tracks 1-7 & 9)
Santi Debriano (tracks 8 & 10), Buster Williams (tracks 1, 2, 4-7 & 9) – bass 
Ronnie Burrage (track 10), Billy Hart (tracks 1, 2, 4-7 & 9) – drums

References

Sonny Fortune albums
1994 albums
Blue Note Records albums
Albums recorded at Van Gelder Studio
Thelonious Monk tribute albums